The Immediate Geographic Region of Cataguases is one of the 10 immediate geographic regions in the Intermediate Geographic Region of Juiz de Fora, one of the 70 immediate geographic regions in the Brazilian state of Minas Gerais and one of the 509 of Brazil, created by the National Institute of Geography and Statistics (IBGE) in 2017.

Municipalities 
It comprises 10 municipalities.

 Argirita    
 Astolfo Dutra    
 Cataguases      
 Dona Eusébia      
 Itamarati de Minas      
 Laranjal (Minas Gerais)      
 Leopoldina (Minas Gerais)      
 Palma (Minas Gerais)      
 Recreio (Minas Gerais) 
 Santana de Cataguases

References 

Geography of Minas Gerais